Tayfun Bademsoy (born 14 October 1958) is a Turkish-German actor who currently has over 250 TV and cinema productions. He is known for his appearance in many crime-scene series. In his first Hollywood role, he played the role of Atlantic Records founder Ahmet Ertegun in the movie Beyond the Sea. Bademsoy is also the voice actor who serves as the character Sayid's German voice in the American TV series Lost.

Filmography

Films 
 Zuhause unter Fremden (1978, TV film)
 The Man in Pyjamas (1981)
  (1983)
 Feuer für den großen Drachen (1983, TV film)
  (1984)
 Die Abschiebung (1985, TV film)
 Schmetterlinge (1988)
 Noel Baba (1989, TV film)
 Ich liebe Deutschland (1991, TV film)
 Heart in the Hand (1992)
 Gefährliche Verbindung (1993, TV film)
 Reise in die Nacht (1998, TV film)
 Tuareg (1999, Short)
  (2001)
 Lassie (2002, Short)
 Liebe Zartbitter (2002, TV film)
 Zoe's Arkadas (2002)
  (2004)
 Beyond the Sea (2004)
 Zeit der Wünsche (2004, TV film)
  (2006)
 Pandora's Box (2008)
 Thank You Mr. President (2008, Short)

TV series 
 Tatort (Voll auf Hass) (1987)
 Magic (1990, 4 Episodes)
 Ein starkes Team (1994–2009, 40 Episodes)
 Tatort (Der Entscheider) (1996)
 Die Straßen von Berlin (1998)
 Schimanski (Schimanski muß leiden) (2000)
 Polizeiruf 110 (2001–2011, 15 episodes)
 Tatort (Zielscheibe) (2001)
 Club der Träume (2002)
 Eva Blond - ...und die vierzig Räuber (2003)
 Tatort (Baum der Erlösung) (2008)

Personal life 
His mother Sabahat Bademsoy has played alongside Bademsoy in various German TV series such as Tatort. His sister Aysun Bademsoy is a documentary film maker living in Germany.

External links 
 
 

1958 births
Living people
Turkish emigrants to Germany
German male film actors
German male television actors
German male voice actors
Turkish male film actors
Turkish male voice actors
Turkish male television actors